Skomorokhov (from скоморох meaning skomorokh, jester) is a Russian masculine surname, its feminine counterpart is Skomorokhova. It may refer to
Vyacheslav Skomorokhov (1940–1994), Ukrainian hurdler
Yevgeni Skomorokhov (1945–2002), Russian football coach and player

Russian-language surnames